Macropsychanthus schimpffii is a species of legume in the family Fabaceae. It is found only in Ecuador. Its natural habitat is subtropical or tropical moist lowland forests.

References

Faboideae
Flora of Ecuador
Data deficient plants
Taxonomy articles created by Polbot
Taxobox binomials not recognized by IUCN